Manado is the capital city of the Indonesian province of North Sulawesi.  It is the second largest city in Sulawesi after Makassar, with the 2020 Census giving a population of 451,916 distributed over a land area of 162.53 km2. The Manado metropolitan area has a population of 1.2 million as of 2018. The city is located adjacent to the Bay of Manado, and is surrounded by a mountainous area.

Manado is among Indonesia's top-five tourism priorities. The city is served by Sam Ratulangi International Airport, which has direct international flights to China, Japan, and Singapore, as well as other domestic destinations. Bunaken National Park is one of the city's most famous tourist attractions.  The city is also known for its Christian-majority population, and holds the country's biggest Christmas celebration annually. It is also recognised as one of the most tolerant and peaceful cities in Indonesia.

Etymology
The name Manado is derived from the Sangir language word manaro, meaning 'on the far coast' or 'in the distance', and originally referred to the further of two islands which can be seen from the mainland.  When the settlement on this island was relocated to the mainland, the name Manado was brought with it, after which the island itself became referred to as Manado Tua (Old Manado). The name for Manado in the Sangir language is Manaro.

History
The first mention of Manado comes from a world map by French cartographer Nicolas Desliens, which shows the island of Manarow (today's Manado Tua). Before Europeans arrived in North Sulawesi, the area was under the rule of the Sultan of Ternate, who exacted tribute and introduced Islam to its inhabitants. The Portuguese made the Sultan their vassal, ruling over the Minahasa people, and establishing a factory in Wenang.

Meanwhile, the Spanish had already set themselves up in the Philippines and Minahasa was used to plant coffee that came from South America because of its rich soil. Manado was further developed by Spain as a centre of commerce for the Chinese traders who traded the coffee in China. With the help of native allies, the Spanish took over the Portuguese fortress in Amurang in the 1550s, and Spanish settlers also established a fort at Manado so that eventually Spain controlled all of the Minahasa. It was in Manado where one of the first Indo-Eurasian (Mestizo) communities in the archipelago developed during the 16th century. The first King of Manado (1630) named Muntu Untu was in fact the son of a Spanish Mestizo.

Spain renounced its possessions in Minahasa by means of a treaty with the Portuguese in return for a payment of 350,000 ducats. Minahasan natives made an alliance treaty with the Dutch, and expelled the last of the Portuguese from Manado a few years later.

The Dutch East India Company or Verenigde Oost Indische Compagnie (VOC) built a fortress in Manado named Fort Amsterdam in 1658. As with regions in eastern Indonesia, Manado has undergone Christianisation by Dutch missionaries, including Riedel and John Gottlieb Schwarz. The Dutch missionaries built the first Christian church in Manado called Oude Kerk (Old church), which still stands, and is now called Gereja Sentrum. HMS Dover captured Manado in June 1810. The Javanese prince Diponegoro was exiled to Manado by the Dutch government in 1830 for leading a war of rebellion against the Dutch. In 1859, the English biologist Alfred Wallace visited Manado and praised the town for its beauty.

In 1919, the Apostolic Prefecture of Celebes was established in the city. In 1961, it was promoted to the Diocese of Manado.

The Japanese captured Manado in the Battle of Manado in January 1942. The city was heavily damaged by Allied bombing during World War II.

In 1958, the headquarters of the rebel movement Permesta was moved to Manado. When Permesta confronted the central government with demands for political, economic and regional reform, Jakarta responded by bombing the city in February 1958, and then invading in June 1958.

In 1962, the People's Representative Council declared Manado as the official capital city of North Sulawesi Province.

Geography
Manado has a tropical rainforest climate (Af) according to the Köppen climate classification, as there is no real dry season. The abundance of rain seems to be influenced by the monsoon. As its location is near the equator, the temperature seems constant throughout the year. Unlike other cities in Indonesia, the temperature seems to be cooler.

Administrative districts

The city is divided into eleven districts (kecamatan). These are tabulated below with their areas and populations at the 2010 Census and 2020 Census. The new districts of Bunaken Kepulauan (Bunaken Islands) and Paal Dua were established in 2012. The table also includes the location of the district administrative centres.

Notes: (a) the 2010 population of Paal Dua District is included in the figure for Tikala District, from which it was cut out in 2013. (b) the 2010 population of Bunaken Kepulauan District is included in the figure for Bunaken District, from which it was cut out in 2013.

The boundaries of Manado city are as follows:
East = Minahasa Regency
North = North Minahasa Regency
South = Minahasa Regency
West = Celebes Sea

Demographics

Ethnicity and languages

Currently, the majority of Manado city residents are from the Minahasa ethnic group, because Manado is located in Minahasan lands. The indigenous people of Manado are from the Tombulu people. The Tombulu language is spoken widely in several urban villages within Manado, for example: Wenang (Wenang / Mahawenang - kolintang), Tumumpa (down), Mahakeret (yelling), Tikala Ares (Walak Ares Tombulu, where the word 'ares' means punishable), Ranotana (ground water), Winangun (built), Wawonasa (wawoinasa - sharpened above), Pinaesaan (unity place), Pakowa (Tree of Treasure), Teling (fur / bamboo to make equipment), Titiwungen (excavated), Tuminting (from the word Ting-Ting: a bell, the inserted syllable -um- changing the noun to a verb, so Tuminting: ringing bell), Pondol (Edge), Wanea (from the word Wanua: meaning the country), etc.  While the Malalayang area has residents mainly from the Bantik people, other indigenous groups in Manado today are from the Sangir, Gorontalo, Mongondow, Babontehu, Talaud, Tionudese, Siau, and Borgo peoples. There are also Arabian peranakan communities, mainly in the Kampung Arab area which is near Pasar '45 and has become a destination for religious tourism. Other ethnicities represented include Javanese, Chinese, Batak, Makassar, and Moluccans.  A small Jewish community also exists.

Manado Malay is the main language spoken in Manado. It is a Malay-based creole. Some of the loan words in the Minahasan vernacular are derived from Dutch, Portuguese, and other foreign languages.

Religion

Protestant Christianity is the major religion in Manado, constituting around 63 percent of all residents, Islam comes second forming about 31 percent, Catholicism comes in third forming around 5 percent, and the rest follow Buddhism, Hinduism, and Confucianism, each coming in at less than 1 percent each, according to the 2020 national census. In addition, about 20 Indonesian Jews live in Manado. The people of Manado identify as tolerant, harmonious, open and dynamic. Therefore, the city of Manado has a relatively conducive social environment, and is known as one safest cities in Indonesia. When Indonesia was vulnerable to political upheaval around 1999, and there were riots in other Indonesian cities, Manado was little affected. This is shown through the slogan of the people of Manado: Torang samua basudara, which means We are all family. And also through the words of Dr. Sam Ratulangi: "Sitou, Timou, Tumou, Tou", which roughly translates to 'Man lives to educate others'.

Transportation

Sam Ratulangi International Airport of Manado is one of the main ports of entry to Indonesia. In 2005, no fewer than 15,000 international passengers entered Indonesia via the city's airport, connected with several Indonesian cities such as Jakarta, Surabaya, Makassar, and others. Other public transportation in Manado are:
Local minibuses known as "Mikrolet" 
Perum DAMRI buses serving airport to Manado
Other buses serving Manado to other cities in North Sulawesi as well as other cities in the island of Sulawesi

Manado–Bitung Toll Road connects the city with Bitung. Terminal Malalayang, or Malalayang Bus Terminal serves as the main gateway for long-distance buses in Manado.

Main sights

Manado is home to some of the biggest and most influential churches in the province, with many of them located along the iconic Sam Ratulangi Street.

Tourism

Ban Hin Kiong Temple is the oldest temple in the city of Manado, which was established in 1819.  It is also a popular tourism spot in the city, especially during the Chinese New Year celebration.
Citraland, a wealthy suburb of Manado, is home to Asia's second tallest and the world's fourth tallest statue of Christ (Christ Blessing Statue), and perhaps the world's first statue in the flying posture.
Manado Boulevard Carnaval (MBC) is a fashion carnival annually every 16 July, aligned with Manado City Birthday.
Other places of interest include nearby Lake Tondano, Lake Linow, Lokon Volcano, Klabat Volcano and Mahawu Volcano, Bukit Kasih (hill of love), and Watu Pinabetengan.
Scuba diving and snorkelling are practised in the nearby Bunaken National Park, including the island of Bunaken.
Several shopping malls in the city are: Manado Town Square, Star Square, and Grand Kawanua City

Cuisine

Food typical of Manado include Tinutuan, which consists of various kinds of vegetables.  Tinutuan is not mush, as so far people have said it as Manado porridge. In addition to Tinutuan, there is Cakalang Fufu, a smoked skipjack (Katsuwonus pelamis), roa fish (exocoetidae or torani) Parexocoetus brachypterus, Kawok which is food based from meat of the forest rodent white rat Maxomys hellwandii; Paniki, bat meat-based dishes; such as (Pteropus pumilus) and Rinte Wuuk (abbreviated to RW) which is a local name of dog meat, Swine pig (a pig is cooked by rotating on the embers), usually served at parties, and Babi Putar (made from pork mixed with Manado spices, rolled and burned in bamboo). 

There is also a typical drink from the area of Manado and its surroundings are saguer which is a kind of wine or palm wine derived from enau / aren tree (Arenga pinnata), which is then fermented. Saguer is a Cap Tikus (spirits with an average of 40% alcohol content). The exact amount of alcohol depends on the technique of distillation, which varies in different villages in Minahasa).

Woku is a type of bumbu (spice mixture) found in Manado cuisine of North Sulawesi, Indonesia. It has rich aroma and spicy taste.  Woku consist of ground spices paste; red ginger, turmeric, candlenut, and red chili pepper, mixed with chopped shallot, scallion, tomato, lemon or citrus leaf, and turmeric leaf, lemon basil leaf, and bruised lemongrass.  Rub main ingredients (chicken or fish) with salt and lime juices, and marinate for 30 minutes.  All spices are cooked in coconut oil until the aroma came up and mixed together with the main ingredients, water, and a pinch of salt, well until all cooked well.

Other typical food of Manado city which is also quite famous is Nasi Kuning which taste and its presentation is different from yellow rice in other area because it is spiked with abon of cakalang rica fish and presented in a parcel using sugar palm leaves.  In addition, there are also grilled fish roasted head.  Dabu-dabu is a very popular typical Manado sauce, made from a mixture of red chillies, cayenne pepper, sliced red onion, and freshly diced tomatoes, and finally given a mixture of soy sauce.

Sister cities

 Bristol, United Kingdom
 Cebu, Philippines
 Davao, Philippines
 Eindhoven, Netherlands
 Koror, Palau
 Liverpool, United Kingdom
 Qingdao, China
 San Sebastian, Spain
 Zamboanga City, Philippines

Language

The local language spoken in Manado and the surrounding area is a creole of the Malay language called Manado Malay.  It exhibits significant influence of Portuguese, Spanish and Dutch, for example:
"But" in Indonesian is "tetapi", in Manado it is called "mar" (maar- Dutch word for but).
Chair in Indonesian is "kursi", in the Minahasa it is called "kadera" (cadeira - Portuguese for chair).
Horse in Indonesian is "kuda", a word of Sanskrit origin.  In the town of Tomohon, a horse is called "kafalio" ("cavalo" - Portuguese, "caballo" - Spanish).

While there is not much known about the origin of ideogramatical Minahasa writing system, currently the orthography used for indigenous Minahasan languages closely matches that used for Indonesian.

Notable people
 Adrianus Taroreh (1966–2013), boxer; competed in the men's lightweight event at the 1988 Summer Olympics
 Alexander Andries Maramis (1897–1977), politician; national hero of Indonesia
 Audrey Vanessa Susilo (born 1999), Miss Indonesia 2022 winner
 Bahar bin Smith (born 1985), Islamist scholar, sayyid and preacher (da'i)
 Benny Dollo (born 1950), football coach; former head coach of Indonesia national football team
 Arthur Frets Assa (born 1964), footballer
 Daan Mogot (1928–1946), military officer; involved in the Indonesian National Revolution
 Firman Utina (born 1981), footballer; former captain of Indonesia national football team
 Greysia Polii (born 1987), badminton player; gold medalist at the 2020 Summer Olympics
 Henk Ngantung (1927–1991), painter and politician; governor of Jakarta (1964–1965)
 John Lie (1911–1988), navy officer; national hero of Indonesia
 Kezia Warouw (born 1991), Puteri Indonesia 2016 winner
 Kristania Virginia Besouw (born 1985), Miss Indonesia 2006 winner
 Liliyana Natsir (born 1985), badminton player; gold medalist at the 2016 Summer Olympics 
 Monica Khonado (born 1996), Miss Earth Indonesia 2020 winner
 Robert Wolter Mongisidi (1925–1949), national hero of Indonesia; involved in the Indonesian National Revolution
 Rocky Gerung (born 1959) Indonesian philosopher and public intellectual
 Yaakov Baruch (born 1982), rabbi of Sha'ar Hashamayim Synagogue (Tondano)

See also

List of regencies and cities of Indonesia

References

External links

Huge Waves Cause Flooding in Manado, Sulawesi, Indonesia - Jan. 17, 2021

 
Cities in Indonesia
Populated coastal places in Indonesia
Populated places in North Sulawesi
Provincial capitals in Indonesia